An oracle was usually a priest or a priestess through whom the gods were supposed to speak or prophesize. In particular:

Pythia – served as an oracle in the Temple of Apollo at Delphi.
Oracle bone – a bone used for divination in ancient China.
Nechung Oracle – the state oracle of Tibet.

The term oracle is used figuratively to describe various terms in science and engineering.

Computing
 An oracle is a black box for solving a certain computationally-hard problem with a single operation. See :Category:Computation oracles.
 For an oracle in mathematical computability theory, see Computable function#Relative computability.
Oracle machine, an algorithm that uses an oracle for a specific problem.
Blockchain oracle, a service that provides smart contracts with information from the outside world
Oracle AI, a hypothetical artificial general intelligence design limited to answering questions

Proper names 
 Oracle Corporation, a software and enterprise hardware company.
 Oracle Database, a database management system
 ORACLE (computer), an early computer

Places 
 Oracle (workhouse), a workhouse erected with funds bequeathed by John Kendrick
 Oracle, Arizona
 The Oracle, Queensland, a development in Australia
 The Oracle, Reading, a shopping mall in England
 Oracle Arena, a sports venue

Publications
 The Oracle (novel), a 2003 book by Catherine Fisher
 The Oracle (University of South Florida), a student newspaper
 The Oracle (magazine), a defunct role-playing games magazine
 San Francisco Oracle, a 1960s underground newspaper
 The Oracle, a 1951 novel by Edwin O'Connor
 Oracle, a 2010 novel by Jackie French
 ORA:CLE, a 1984 novel by Kevin O'Donnell, Jr.
 The Oracle, a student newspaper of Hamline University
 The Oracle, a student newspaper of Stratford High School
 "Oracle", a short story by Greg Egan

Entertainment

Comics
Oracle (Marvel Comics), a Marvel character and member of the Shi'ar Imperial Guard
Oracle, an alias used by DC Comics character Barbara Gordon
Gus Yale, a successor of Oracle
Oracle, the original alias of the DC Comics character who would be reimagined as Aurakles
Oracle Inc., a company established by the Marvel character Namor
The Oracle, a W.I.T.C.H. character

Film and television
 ORACLE (teletext), a British teletext service that was available on ITV and Channel 4
 The Oracle (film), a 1953 film
 Oracle (upcoming film), an American horror thriller film
 The Oracle (The Matrix)
 The Oracle (TV series), a 1979 Australian drama series
 The Oracle in Aladdin and the King of Thieves
 The Oracle, a Casper Meets Wendy character

Games
 The Oracle of Delphi, a 2016 strategy board game designed by Stefan Feld.

Other fictional characters
 Oracle, a Spider Riders character

Music albums
 Oracle (Kittie album)
 Oracle (Sunn O))) album)
 Oracle (Michael Hedges album)
 Oracle (Gary Peacock and Ralph Towner album)
 Oracles (album), an album by Fleshgod Apocalypse
 The Oracle (Hank Jones album)
 The Oracle (Godsmack album)
 The Oracle (Dark Sermon album)
The Oracle (Cindy Blackman album)

Songs
 "The Oracle", a composition by Tony Banks
 "Oracle", a song by Scale the Summit from the album The Migration

Other uses
 Oracle (rocket), model rocket for aerial photography
 BMW Oracle Racing, an American sailing syndicate
 Internet Oracle, a collaborative humor website
 Oracle, a technical symposium organized at Government College of Technology, Coimbatore
 Oracle bone script, the earliest Chinese and East Asian writing, script and word.

See also
 Auricle (disambiguation)
 Divination
 Divine revelation in Christianity
 Fortune-telling
 Omen
 Urim and Thummim in Judaism